Amoebic gill disease (AGD) is a potentially fatal disease of some marine fish. It is caused by Neoparamoeba perurans, the most important amoeba in cultured fish. It primarily affects farm raised fish of the family Salmonidae, most notably affecting the Tasmanian Atlantic salmon (Salmo salar) industry, costing the A$20 million a year in treatments and lost productivity. Turbot, bass, bream, sea urchins and crabs have also been infected.

The disease has also been reported affecting the commercial salmon fisheries of the United States, Australia, New Zealand, France, Spain, Ireland and Chile. It was first diagnosed in the summer of 1984/1985 in populations of Atlantic salmon off the east coast of Tasmania and was found to be caused by N. perurans n.sp.

Clinical signs and diagnosis
Symptoms typically begin to appear two months after the fish are transferred from freshwater hatcheries to open net sea cages. Symptoms include mucus build-up on the gills of infected fish and hyper-plasic lesions, causing white spots and eventual deterioration of the gill tissue. Fish will show signs of dyspnoea such as rapid opercular movements and lethargy.  Although usually recognised by hyperplasic and proliferative gill lesions, the effects of AGD occur before oxygen transfer across the gill is severely compromised.  AGD affected fish show a significant increase in vascular resistance contributing to cardiovascular collapse.  Such effects result in compensatory changes in heart shape to improve its efficiency at pumping blood.

Contributing factors are an ambient water temperature above 16 degrees Celsius, crowding and poor water circulation inside the sea pens. Clinical cases are more common in the Summer. The lesions on the gills are highly suggestive of infection. Gill biopsies can be observed under the microscope for amoebas, or tested using fluorescent antibody testing.

Treatment and control
Currently, the most effective treatment is transferring the affected fish to a freshwater bath for a period of 2 to 3 hours. This is achieved by towing the sea cages into fresh water, or pumping the fish from the sea cage to a tarp filled with fresh water. Mortality rates have been lowered by adding levamisole to the water until the saturation is above 10ppm. Due to the difficulty and expense of treatment, the productivity of salmon aquaculture is limited by access to a source of fresh water. Chloramine and chlorine dioxide have also been used.  Other potential in-feed treatments such as immunosupportive-based feeds, mucolytic compounds such as L-cysteine ethyl ester and the parasiticide bithionol have been tested with some success although not developed for commercial use.

Notes

References

 Amoebic Gill Disease Wikivet. Retrieved 6 October 2011.

Fish diseases